Robert Carson may refer to:
*Robert Carson (numismatist) (1918–2006), British numismatist
Robert Carson (actor) (1909–1979), American actor
Robert Carson (baseball) (born 1989), American baseball player
Robert Carson (writer) (1909–1983), American  screenwriter, novelist, and short story writer
Robert Henry Carson (1885–1971), Canadian life insurance agent and politician
Robert "Sonny" Carson (1936–2002), activist and community leader in Brooklyn

See also
Carson (surname)
Carson (disambiguation)
Robert Carsen (born 1954), Canadian opera director